Závada may refer to:


Places

Czech Republic
Závada (Opava District), a municipality and village in the Moravian-Silesian Region
Závada (Petrovice u Karviné), a village and part Petrovice u Karviné in the Moravian-Silesian Region

Slovakia
Závada, Humenné District, a municipality and village in the Prešov Region
Závada, Topoľčany District, a municipality and village in the Nitra Region
Závada, Veľký Krtíš District, a municipality and village in the Banská Bystrica Region

People
Zavada (surname)

See also

Zawada (disambiguation), the Polish equivalent